Banda Sakti is a district in Lhokseumawe, Aceh, Indonesia.

Administrative divisions 
list the name of the village (Gampong) is in Districts of Banda Sakti

 Gampong Tumpok Teungoh (postcode: 24311)
 Gampong Simpang Empat (postcode: 24313)
 Gampong Lhokseumawe (postcode: 24314)
 Gampong Pusong Baru (postcode: 24314)
 Gampong Kampung Jawa Baru (postcode: 24315)
 Gampong Banda Masem (postcode: 24351)
 Gampong Hagu Barat Laut (postcode: 24351)
 Gampong Hagu Selatan (postcode: 24351)
 Gampong Hagu Teungoh (postcode: 24351)
 Gampong Kampung Jawa Lama (postcode: 24351)
 Gampong Keude Aceh (postcode : 24351)
 Gampong Kuta Blang (postcode : 24351)
 Gampong Lancang Garam (postcode : 24351)
 Gampong Mon Geudong (postcode : 24351)
 Gampong Pusong Lama (postcode : 24351)
 Gampong Ujong Blang (postcode : 24351)
 Gampong Ulee Jalan (postcode : 24351)
 Gampong Uteun Bayi (postcode : 24351)

References 

Lhokseumawe
Populated places in Aceh
districts of Lhokseumawe